The 2023 Charlotte 49ers football team will represent the University of North Carolina at Charlotte in the 2023 NCAA Division I FBS football season. The 49ers play their home games at Jerry Richardson Stadium in Charlotte, North Carolina, and compete in their first season as a member of the American Athletic Conference (AAC). They are led by first-year head coach Biff Poggi.

Previous season
The 49ers finished the 2022 season 3–9, 2–6 in their final season of C-USA play to finish in 10th place. Head Coach Will Healy was fired after the loss to FIU. Pete Rossomando served as interim coach for the final four games.

Coaching staff

On November 15, Michigan associate head coach Biff Poggi was named the 49ers' third head coach of the modern era. Maryland co-offensive coordinator and tight ends coach Mike Miller was reported to be taking the offensive coordinator and quarterbacks coaching position on November 29. On December 2 Saint Frances Academy defensive line coach Wayne Dorsey took the same position for the 49ers. On November 30 it was reported that Auburn's quarterbacks coach Mike Hartline would become the 49ers wide receivers coach and pass game coordinator. On December 3 it was revealed that Buffalo defensive backs coach Rod Ojong would be accepting the same position at Charlotte. On December 21 Colorado offensive line coach Kyle DeVan accepted the same position on the 49ers staff in addition to being named associate head coach and run game coordinator. On the same date LSU graduate assistant and former Notre Dame team captain Greer Martini was named linebackers coach. On January 5 Michigan Offensive Analyst John Morookian was named tight ends and offensive tackles coach. On the same day Illinois special teams analyst Greg Froelich was named running backs coach and special teams coordinator. On January 11 Texas Southern defensive backs coach Justin Sanders was named safeties coach. On January 16 longtime Poggi friend and business associate Jonathon Jacobson was named assistant head coach and senior advisor. On January 24 Baltimore Ravens defensive assistant Ryan Osborn was named the defensive coordinator and outside linebackers coach, completing the 2023 football staff.

Recruiting

Position key

Recruiting class
The following recruits and transfers have signed letters of intent or verbally committed to the Charlotte 49ers football program for the 2023 recruiting year.

Key transfers

Other Incoming Transfers

Departing Players

2023 NFL Draft

The following players were selected in the 2023 NFL Draft.

Outgoing Transfers

Notes

Graduation

Players

Depth chart

Schedule

Game summaries

South Carolina State

Sources:

Game notes:

1st meeting between these two programs.

Maryland

Sources:

Game notes:

2nd meeting in the series since 2022, (UMD 1-0).

Georgia State

Sources:

Game notes:

5th game in the series since 2015, (Tied 2-2)

Florida

Sources:

Game notes:

1st meeting between these two programs.
Charlotte AD Mike Hill was a long term member of the Gators athletics department joining in 1993 as a marketing coordinator and rising through various offices up to executive associate AD for external affairs before accepting the top job at Charlotte in 2018.

SMU

Sources:

Game notes:

1st meeting between these two programs.

Navy

Sources:

Game notes:

1st meeting between these two programs.

East Carolina

Sources:

Game notes:

1st meeting between these two programs.

Florida Atlantic

Sources:

Game notes:

9th game in the series since 2015, (FAU 6-2).

Tulsa

Sources:

Game notes:

1st meeting between these two programs.

Memphis

Sources:

Game notes:

1st meeting between these two programs.

Rice

Sources:

Game notes:

7th game in the series since 2015, (Tied 2-2).

South Florida

Sources:

Game notes:

1st meeting between these two programs.

Attendance

References

Charlotte
Charlotte 49ers football seasons
Charlotte 49ers football